Bicyclus graueri, or Grauer's bush brown, is a butterfly in the family Nymphalidae. It is found in Nigeria, Cameroon, the Democratic Republic of the Congo, Uganda and western Tanzania. The habitat consists of sub-montane forests.

Subspecies
Bicyclus graueri graueri (eastern Democratic Republic of the Congo, Uganda, north-western Tanzania)
Bicyclus graueri choveti Libert, 1996 (eastern Nigeria, western Cameroon)

References

Elymniini
Butterflies described in 1914